Valvik is a surname. Notable people with the surname include:

Monica Valvik (born 1970), Norwegian cyclist
Svein Inge Valvik (born 1956), Norwegian discus thrower